Dako  is a canton and  village in the Assoli Prefecture in the Kara Region  of north-eastern Togo.

References

Populated places in Kara Region
Assoli Prefecture
Cantons of Togo